"Free" is a song by American recording artist Ultra Naté, released on March 31, 1997, through record label Strictly Rhythm. It was co-written by Naté, Lem Springsteen and John Ciafone, while production was held by both Springsteen and Ciafone. "Free" was served as the lead single from her third studio album, Situation: Critical (1997). Musically, the song is a house-influenced song that incorporates strong 1990s soul, dance-pop, garage and disco.

"Free" received positive reviews from contemporary music critics, who commended her vocal ability and production, and has received several accolades since its release; it has been noted as one of the best dance anthems during the 1990s decade. It became Naté's most successful single to date, charting in many countries around the world. "Free" reached number-one in Italy, and peaked inside the top ten in Canada, France, Iceland, Ireland, Switzerland and the United Kingdom. It also charted on the US Billboard Hot 100, peaking at number 75, but reached number-one on the Billboard Hot Dance Club Songs chart.

Ultra Naté performed the song in various TV-shows, like the British music chart television programme Top of the Pops, where she performed several times.

Background and release

Naté displayed her singing talent at an early age. She sang in church and studied medicine at the university in Baltimore. At weekends she went to clubs, where she met house music production team The Basement Boys. They started writing songs together, and released the 1991 album Blue Notes in the Basement. After she was dropped from the label, she signed Strictly Rhythm in New York. They wanted to release a new album with Naté, and she teamed up with producers and songwriters John Clafone and Lem Springsteen in Mood II Swing.

Naté was very inspired by "Losing My Religion" by R.E.M. and wanted a rock song that would work in clubs, adding the guitar line at the beginning of the song. The famous riff was played by Woody Pak, a friend of Springsteen. The title of the song came up completely random in the process of making a song that everyone could connect to. Naté co-wrote the lyrics and had written two different versions with two different verses, B-sections, etc. They then started cutting up the best bits of both versions and in the end, it all was put together as the final version of what would become known as "Free". Three gospel-singers; Audrey Wheeler, Cindy Mizelle and Khadejia Bass were hired to perform the chorus with Naté. American DJ, Little Louie Vega was the first DJ to play the promotional copy of "Free" in clubs. From there, the single went on becoming a global hit. The gay community saw it as a song about empowerment and made it a huge anthem.

Critical reception
"Free" received positive reviews from most music critics. Barry Walters for The Advocate wrote, "One of house music's most independent-minded divas creates an anthem celebrating liberty in general and gay pride for those with ears to hear it." Trish Maunder from The Age declared it as an "joyous dance-floor anthem". AllMusic had highlighted three official versions of the song as "AllMusic Track Picks"; the Bob Sinclar Remix, Jason Nevins Mix and the original version of the song. J.D. Considine from The Baltimore Sun described it as a "guitar-driven dance tune", noting its "arpeggiated guitar and sly, melancholy melody". Larry Flick from Billboard stated that it "shows [Naté] in excellent vocal form, belting with a level of authority that only comes with time and experience." He remarked that the singer "has a field day with the message of empowerment that fuels "Free", not to mention producers Lem Springsteen and Jon Ciafone's invigorating soul-house groove." Pamela Rivers from Columbia Daily Spectator named it the "high point" of the Situation: Critical album. Richard Wallace from the Daily Mirror viewed it as a "divine" dance single.

Dave Sholin from the Gavin Report commented, "Don't let this one slip by without a careful listen." Caroline Sullivan from The Guardian complimented it as a "piano-led" hit with "sunny house beat propelled by Ultra's paint-blistering voice." Derrick Mathis from LA Weekly described it as "infectious", "with Ultra ordering us — above some righteous backup vocals — to be free and "do whatcha want to do". James Hyman from Music Week'''s RM rated "Free" five out of five, naming it House Tune of the Week. He concluded, "One of this year's Miami club anthems will live up to the hype when released here through its simplicity and strong Mood II Swing production. Sweet, summery 'Woody Pak-ed' guitars wrap themselves around bouncy bass and uplifting "You're free...to do what you want to do..." vocals to produce clear catchyness." A reviewer from the publication Resident Advisor awarded the song four stars out of five, saying, "This is a solid package from Curvve Recordings. 'Free' has already received widespread plays from jocks worldwide, this time around it appears that it may well do the same. An absolute crowd puller, and an essential release for any house DJ that is looking for something to fill up a dance floor in seconds." Irish Sunday Life called it an "anthemic" hit single, remarking that it "overwhelms" the other songs of the album.

Chart performance
"Free" reached number one in Italy and on the US Billboard Hot Dance Club Songs chart. It peaked inside the top 10 in Canada, France, Iceland, Ireland, Switzerland, and the United Kingdom. In the latter country, it reached number four during its second week on the UK Singles Chart, on June 15, 1997. The song also was a top-20 hit in Norway and Belgium, where it reached numbers 17 and 11, respectively. In addition, it peaked within the top 30 in the Netherlands, New Zealand, and Sweden, the top 40 in Australia and Austria, and the top 50 in Germany. On the Eurochart Hot 100, "Free" went to number eight in September 1997. On the Billboard Hot 100, it peaked at number 75. It was certified gold in France and platinum in the United Kingdom, with respective sales of 250,000 and 600,000.

Music video
A music video was produced to promote "Free". It was directed by American filmmakers Fenton Bailey and Randy Barbato. The video features Naté performing the song in an empty hospital. Some scenes shows the singer wearing a strait-jacket. She told in a 1998 interview, "That's a symbolic situation, a dream sequence, the strait-jacket represents certain limits people put on themselves. In the end, I wake up from that dream." There are two different edits of the video, with some different scenes. "Free" was later published on YouTube in June 2008, and had generated more than 11 million views as of January 2023.

Impact and legacyDJ Magazine ranked it number five in their list of the "Top 100 Club Tunes" in 1998. MTV Dance placed "Free" at number 31 in their list of "The 100 Biggest 90's Dance Anthems of All Time" in November 2011. In "The Top 10 Dance Tunes of the '90s" for Attitude in June 2016, the song was ranked at number one.

The song was voted the top track of 1997 by UK electronic dance music magazine Mixmag. The magazine later included the song on their list of the "30 Best Vocal House Anthems Ever" in 2018, writing, "The opening bars are delicate, but soon enough the bumping production kicks in, underpinning a vocal that burns with the potency of the sun's surface, encouraging dancers to live by Ultra Naté's words and be free." In 2019, "Free" was also included in their list of "The 20 Best Diva House Tracks".

Dave Fawbert from ShortList stated that the song "remains, forever, an eternal banger" in 2017.

British singer-songwriter and actor Will Young chose "Free" as his all-time favorite sunshine track in 2019. He said about the track, "MTV was so big then and this video came along and Ultra Nate had very short hair, dyed yellow and was so different-looking – she paved the way for a different kind of artist."

Tomorrowland voted it number one in their official list of "The Ibiza 500" in 2021. The year before, it was voted number nine on the same list.

In 2022, Time Out ranked it number 14 in their list of "The 50 Best Gay Songs to Celebrate Pride All Year Long", while Pitchfork featured it in their ranking of "The 30 Best House Tracks of the ’90s".

Track listing
 "Free" (Mood II Swing Radio Edit) – 3:51
 "Free" (Full Intention Radio Edit) – 3:18
 "Free" (Mood II Swing Extended Vocal Mix) – 12:09
 "Free" (Full Intention Vocal Mix) – 6:50
 "Free" (R.I.P. Up North Mix) – 6:45
 "Free" (R.I.P. Down South Dub) – 6:25
 "Free" (Mood II Swing Live Mix) – 7:42
 "Free" (Mood II Swing Dub Mix) – 8:52
 "Free" (Full Intention Sugar Daddy Dub) – 6:05
 "Free" (Bob Sinclar Remix) – 8:40

Remixes
 In 2005, Curvve Recordings & Peace Bisquit released the official remixes of "Free", which peaked on the US Billboard'' Dance Chart at number 23. Remixers included:
 "Free" (Oscar G remix)
 "Free" (Junior Sanchez Remix)
 "Free" (Brick City Remix)
 "Free" (Corbett and Vinny Troia remix)
 "Free" (Jason Nevins Remix)
 In 2016, Defected Records released a Deep House remix/mashup of "Free" made by Claptone, called "The First Time Free (Claptone Remix)". This track includes the guitar riff from "Free", overlaid with the vocals from "The First Time", by Roland Clark.
 In 2020, Dimitri Vegas & Like Mike released on Smash The House D'Angello & Francis' Future Rave Remix of Free (Live Your Life)

Charts and certifications

Weekly charts

Year-end charts

Certifications

References

1997 singles
1997 songs
Number-one singles in Italy
AM PM Records singles
Strictly Rhythm singles
Ultra Naté songs

fr:Free (chanson)